Piz Albris is a mountain in the Livigno Alps of the Swiss Alps. It is located in the canton of Graubünden. Its  summit overlooks the Val Bernina.

References

External links

Piz Albris on Hikr

Mountains of the Alps
Mountains of Graubünden
Alpine three-thousanders
Mountains of Switzerland
Pontresina